Damas is a genus of skippers in the family Hesperiidae.

Species
Recognised species in the genus Damas include:
 Damas clavus (Herrich-Schäffer, 1869)
 Damas immacula Nicolay, 1973

References

Natural History Museum Lepidoptera genus database

Hesperiinae
Hesperiidae genera